In digital communications, an encoding law is a (typically non-uniform) allocation of signal quantization levels across the possible analog signal levels in an analog-to-digital converter system. They can be viewed as a simple form of instantaneous companding. 
 
The best-known encoding laws are the μ-law and A-law encoding laws defined in the ITU-T standard G.711 for use in digital telephony, and still used to the present day.

References

Digital signal processing